Taraxacum farinosum, common name in Turkish cırtlık, is a type of perennial dandelion that grows between 800 and 1200 m on salty soils in central Turkey. It is herbaceous halophyte plant up to 5–15 cm tall. Irano-Turanian Region or Iran-Turan Plant Geography Region element.

References

farinosum
Endemic flora of Turkey
Halophytes
Taxa named by Joseph Friedrich Nicolaus Bornmüller
Taxa named by Heinrich Carl Haussknecht
Taxa named by Heinrich von Handel-Mazzetti